Barclays Western Bank Ltd v Pretorius is an important case in South African law, particularly in the area of civil procedure; it was an appeal of Western Bank Ltd v Pretorius.

Facts 
Provisional sentence had been claimed on two surety bonds. The feature of the litigation which brought it before the court was that neither bond contained an acknowledgment by the defendant that she was indebted to the plaintiff in a specific amount; nor did either bond contain an unequivocal promise by her to pay the plaintiff a definite sum.

Issue 
The question confronting the court was whether such a bond could support a claim for provisional sentence.

Law 
The leading case in this area of the law was Union Share Agency  Investment Ltd v Spain. "It is the essence of the doctrine of provisional sentence," the court held in that case, "that the acknowledgement of debt or the undertaking to pay should be clear and certain on the face of the document itself, and that no extrinsic evidence should be required to establish the indebtedness."

In the case of Bee-Jay Ltd v Knights-Trench, the court found that it was "fundamental that a document, to support a claim for provisional sentence, must be clear and certain as to the indebtedness [.... T]he indebtedness cannot be clear and certain if the amount thereof is uncertain."

According to the court in Lagerwey v Rich and Others,

One starts with the proposition that provisional sentence, being an extraordinary remedy whereunder the plaintiff enjoys special and important advantages, is granted only in a case which falls strictly within a particular class. It is granted only when the plaintiff has a claim for the payment of money supported by strong prima facie proof in the form of a liquid document which the defendant has signed, or to which he is deemed to have given his assent. A document is liquid, in the context of an action for provisional sentence, only if it reflects unequivocally a present indebtedness by the defendant in a specific sum of money.

Judgment 
After considering these authorities, the court held that provisional sentence could not be granted on a surety bond which, while limiting the surety's liability to a prescribed maximum, covered a principal indebtedness in an indefinite amount, without even acknowledging that any at all existed. No subsequent certificate, as provided for in the bond, indicating the amount of the indebtedness, could cure the intrinsic illiquidity of such a document.

Didcott J thus took a stand against the expansion of the provisional-sentence procedure, focusing on its disadvantages and oppressive byproducts. The procedure is recognised, however, as a commercial necessity, since most of the time defendants do not actually have a defence.

References 
Barclays Western Bank Ltd v Pretorius 1979 (3) SA 637 (N).
The Law of South Africa. Butterworths. 1985. Volume 3. Paragraph 229 at page 127. 1986. Volume 26. Page 139. Second Edition. LexisNexis Butterworths. 2003. Volume 3(1). Paragraph 213 at page 131. Volume 17. Paragraph 444. Volume 26. Paragraph 195.
Mervyn Dendy (ed). The Civil Practice of the Supreme Court of South Africa. Fourth Edition. Juta. 1997. Pages 970, 979 and 986.
The Civil Practice of the High Courts and the Supreme Court of Appeal of South Africa. Fifth Edition. Juta. 2009. Volume 2. Pages 1316, 1317, 1320, 1323, 1326, 1327, 1332, 1339 and 1340.
Mervyn Dendy. Civil Procedure Sibergramme Yearbook 2005. Siber Ink. 2006. p 68.
Scott and Scott. Wille's Law of Mortgage and Pledge in South Africa. Third Edition. Juta. 1987. Pages 217, 218 and 223.
H J Erasmus, "Civil Procedure" [1979] Annual Survey of South African Law 438 at 440 and 441.
H J Erasmus, "Civil Procedure" [1980] Annual Survey of South African Law 454 at 459.
Edwin Cameron and Dirk Van Zyl Smit, "The Administration of Justice, Law Reform and Jurisprudence" [1979] Annual Survey of South African Law 511 at 542 and 543.
Andrew Beck, "Liquid Documents in Provisional Sentence Proceedings" (1987) 104 SALJ 452 at 461 and 463.
Cheryl Loots, "Provisional sentence on deeds of suretyship and covering bonds" (1980) 97 South African Law Journal 233.
Zamazulu Nkubungu, "Are provisional sentence proceedings constitutional?" De Rebus, 1 October 2012, p 30.
A C Beck, "Onus of proof in provisional sentence proceedings" (1989) 52 Tydskrif vir Hedendaagse Romeins-Hollandse Reg (Journal of Contemporary Roman-Dutch Law) 54 at 57.
Twee Jonge Gezellen v Land and Agricultural Development Bank 2011 (3) SA 1 (CC) at 3.
HVD Investments (Pty) Ltd v Neffke 1984 (2) SA 368 at 370.
Wollach v Barclays National Bank Ltd 1983 (2) SA 543 at 550.
Dowson & Dobson Industrial Ltd v Van der Werf and Others 1981 (4) SA 417 (C) at 420.

1978 in South African law
1978 in case law
KwaZulu-Natal Division cases